Ali Qasim Rabea is a leftist political activist in Bahrain, currently a leader of the Haq Movement. Before joining Haq he was part of Wa'ad. Rabea was elected to the 1973 National Assembly before it was dissolved. He has been an opposition activist calling for the restoration of democracy in Bahrain. In October 1998, the government of Bahrain arrested him along with fellow opposition activist Isa Al Jowder, for signing a petition demanding political reform in the country.

He is one of the signatories on a 2008 petition calling for Prime Minister Khalifah ibn Sulman Al Khalifah to be sacked from office.

See also
 Haq Movement
 Abdulhadi Khalaf

References

Publications
'Popular Petition Committee in Bahrain's National Struggle'
 'Ali Rabea Discusses the Nineties', Alwaqt newspaper: Parts: 1, 2, 3, 4, 5, 6, 7, last
'Democracy and Discrimination in Bahrain'
 'Whither the National Movement'

Bahraini dissidents
Bahraini left-wing activists
Members of the National Assembly (Bahrain)
Bahraini Sunni Muslims
Living people
Haq Movement politicians
Year of birth missing (living people)